Blumenau is a city in Vale do Itajaí, Santa Catarina state, in the South Region of Brazil,  from the state capital Florianópolis.

The city was founded by the German chemist and pharmacist Hermann Blumenau (1819–1899), who arrived on a boat via the Itajaí-Açu River accompanied by seventeen other Germans, and still celebrates its German heritage, including the second largest Oktoberfest in the world.

History 

The city was founded September 2, 1850, by Hermann Bruno Otto Blumenau and seventeen other German immigrants. Later arrivals include biologist and early proponent of Darwinian Evolution, Fritz Müller.

The history of Blumenau is the result of the arrival of German immigrants who settled these fertile areas of the Atlantic Forest. Having an interest in the problems faced by European immigrants, in 1845 Hermann Blumenau reached an agreement with the Society for the Protection of German Emigrants to represent it and traveled to Brazil, aiming to create new German settlements and to check the situation of those that already existed. He traveled to Rio Grande do Sul, and then to Santa Catarina, where he visited the German colony of São Pedro de Alcântara. Aware of comments about the Itajaí Valley, he explored it in detail, in association with his compatriot Ferdinand Hackradt, since the aforementioned society was dissolved.

After taking certain precautions, Hermann Blumenau headed for Germany, to seek immigrants. On September 2, 1850, Hermann Blumenau returned to the chosen area with the seventeen initial immigrants. Despite the floods, clashes with wild animals and even with the indigenous peoples, due to the work of German immigrants willing to migrate continuously in greater numbers, the settlement prospered.

On February 4, 1880, the municipality of Blumenau was created, composed of about 13,000 residents.

Demographics 

, Blumenau had an estimated population of 361,855 people, with an area of 519 km2 (200 sq mi). The main ethnic origin of the city inhabitants are German and Italian. The city displays many historical and cultural reminders of their heritage, such as houses and other buildings built in traditional German styles, statues, and memorials.

Blumenau, compared to other Brazilian cities, has a very high Human Development Index, 0.806 as of 2010.

Ethnic composition  
Source: 2010 IBGE Census

Religion 
Source: 2010 IBGE Census

Geography 
The city is located in a valley bisected by the Itajaí-Açu River, surrounded by hills with forests. The lower areas, including towers and tall buildings in the city center, constantly suffer from the threat of floods. Blumenau's first recorded flood took place in the dawn on September 23, 1880. The worst took place in 1983 and 1984, when the city was completely isolated for weeks. Today, Blumenau is well-prepared against such threats, but many citizens prefer to live in higher areas spread into the nearby hills and plains to avoid flooding. However, this planning could not avoid even worse flooding in late November 2008, that killed over 100 and forced thousands to evacuate.

Climate 
The climate of Blumenau is considered to be subtropical, a climate of transition between the predominantly tropical climate of Brazil and the predominantly temperate climate of Argentina. Under the Köppen climate classification, the city has a warm, humid subtropical climate.

Blumenau, like the entire state of Santa Catarina, is located south of the Tropic of Capricorn; therefore it is mild in the winter with temperatures averaging 16.6 °C (61 °F) and hot and humid in the summer with high temperatures averaging around 30 °C (87 °F). On July 23, 2013 the downtown of the city got a snow-rain mix and higher neighborhoods had accumulating snow.

Economy 
Blumenau's main economic activity is still the textile industry, represented by large manufacturers such as Cia. Hering, Karsten and Teka.

Another area that draws attention is that of information technology; the city is the headquarters of the so-called Brazilian Silicon Valley, and many software leaders in its segment, some of whom were born in Blusoft and Instituto Gene startup incubators. Blumenau is also known as a location for the manufacturing of metallurgic, mechanical, and electrical equipment.

It has a strong economy, boosted by strong trade, service, and tourism events, with exhibitions of international importance, which are generally held in Vila Germânica (German Villa Park). Additionally, a new but rapidly expanding market is the production of craft beer, such as Eisenbahn.

Transport 
Even though Blumenau has its own airport, normally passengers use scheduled flights operated from Ministro Victor Konder International Airport, located in the nearby municipality of Navegantes. Gol Airlines, Azul Brazilian Airlines, Latam, and Avianca offer for its passengers bus transfers between Navegantes and Blumenau at regular times.

Tourism 
The Blumenau's Tourism Department maintains four tour routes covering different aspects of the city. Besides these, there's the festival of the municipality. Also, the Oktoberfest of Blumenau, held every October, attracts over a million tourists every year.

Subdivisions 
Blumenau has 35 neighbourhoods:

Notable people 

Hermann Blumenau (1819–1899) German pharmacist who founded the city of Blumenau
Emílio Henrique Baumgart (1889 in Blumenau - 1943) architect and engineer
 Fritz Müller (1821 – 1897 in Blumenau)  biologist, an early advocate of Darwinism
Vera Fischer (born 1951 in Blumenau) actress
Rita Schadrack (1931 in Blumenau – 1988) film, stage, and voice actress 
 Martin Drewes (1918 – 2013 in Blumenau) Luftwaffe military aviator, night fighter ace in WWII
 Mariana Weickert (born 1972 in Blumenau) model
João Geraldo Kuhlmann (1882 in Blumenau - 1958) a botanist, specialist on the taxonomy of Angiosperms
Luiz Henrique da Silveira (1940 in Blumenau – 2015) politician and lawyer
 Edward af Sillén (born 1982 in Blumenau) Swedish screenwriter & director for film and TV 
 Armin Zimmermann (1917 in Blumenau – 1976) German admiral and Inspector General of the Bundeswehr

Sport 

 Tiago Splitter, (born 1985 in Blumenau) former professional basketball player
Tiago Volpi, (born 1990 in Blumenau) football goalkeeper
Bruna Pickler, (born 1990 in Blumenau), athlete, actress, composer and sports reporter 
Ana Amorim Taleska, (born 1983 in Blumenau) handball player
 Christian Maicon Hening, (born 1978 in Blumenau) football player
Eduarda Amorim Taleska, (born 1986 in Blumenau) handball player
 Rafael Schmitz, (born 1980 in Blumenau) football player
Barbara Bruch, (born 1987 in Blumenau) female volleyball player
 Jean Carlo Witte, (born 1977 in Blumenau) football player
Nathan Allan de Souza, (born 1996 in Blumenau) football player 
Ana Moser, (born 1968 in Blumenau) former volleyball player, team captain and team gold medallist at the 1996 Summer Olympics

Twin towns – sister cities

Blumenau is twinned with:
 Bariloche, Argentina
 Campinas, Brazil

 Osorno, Chile
 Petrópolis, Brazil           
 Weingarten, Germany 
 Posadas, Argentina
 Badajoz, Spain  
 Oxapampa, Peru

See also 
 Colonia Tovar
 Timbó
 Villa General Belgrano

References

Sources

External links 

 

 
Populated places established in 1850
1850 establishments in Brazil
German-Brazilian culture
Municipalities in Santa Catarina (state)